Jochen Schneider (born September 19, 1942 in Stuttgart) is a West German sprint canoeist who competed in the late 1960s and early 1970s. He won two medals at the ICF Canoe Sprint World Championships a silver (K-4 10000 m: 1970) and a bronze (K-1 10000 m: 1971).

Schneider also competed in the K-4 1000 m event at the 1968 Summer Olympics in Mexico City, but was eliminated in the semifinal round.

References

Sports-reference.com profile

1942 births
Sportspeople from Stuttgart
Canoeists at the 1968 Summer Olympics
German male canoeists
Living people
Olympic canoeists of West Germany
ICF Canoe Sprint World Championships medalists in kayak